Marcello Stella (died 1642) was a Roman Catholic prelate who served as Bishop of Isernia (1640–1642).

Biography
Marcello Stella was ordained a priest on 29 June 1636.
On 26 March 1640, he was appointed during the papacy of Pope Urban VIII as Bishop of Isernia.
On 9 April 1640, he was consecrated bishop by Gil Carrillo de Albornoz, Cardinal-Priest of Santa Maria in Via, with Vincenzo Napoli, Bishop of Patti, and Deodato Scaglia, Bishop of Melfi e Rapolla, serving as co-consecrators. 
He served as Bishop of Isernia until his death in 1642.

References

External links and additional sources
 (for Chronology of Bishops) 
 (for Chronology of Bishops)  

17th-century Italian Roman Catholic bishops
Bishops appointed by Pope Urban VIII
1642 deaths